The 2014–15 Western Illinois Leathernecks men's basketball team represented Western Illinois University during the 2014–15 NCAA Division I men's basketball season. The Leathernecks, led by first year head coach Billy Wright, played their home games at Western Hall and were members of The Summit League. They finished the season 8–20, 3–13 in Summit League play to finish in last place. They lost in the quarterfinals of The Summit League tournament to South Dakota State.

Roster

Schedule

|-
!colspan=9 style="background:#663399; color:#FFD700;"| Exhibition

|-
!colspan=9 style="background:#663399; color:#FFD700;"| Regular season

|-
!colspan=9 style="background:#663399; color:#FFD700;"|The Summit League tournament

References

Western Illinois Leathernecks men's basketball seasons
Western Illinois
Western
Western